The Amiga 4000T, also known as A4000T, is a tower version of Commodore's A4000 personal computer. Using the AGA chipset, it was originally released in small quantities in 1994 with a 25 MHz Motorola 68040 CPU, and re-released in greater numbers by Escom in 1995, after Commodore's demise, along with a new variant which featured a 50 MHz Motorola 68060 CPU. Despite the subsequent demise of Escom, production was continued by QuikPak in North America into at least 1997.

The A4000T was the only Amiga ever to have both SCSI and IDE interfaces built-in on the motherboard. Having driver software for both interfaces in the 512 KB ROM meant that some other parts of AmigaOS had to be moved from the ROM, and thus the A4000T was the only machine to require the file "workbench.library" to be stored on disk (this has changed, though, with the introduction of AmigaOS3.2 and kickstart 3.2, which too require workbench.library (and icon.library) to be stored on disk).  It was also the only Amiga to use a PC form factor for the motherboard (AT), and one of the few to use a lithium battery instead of a nickel–cadmium rechargeable battery, vastly reducing the risk of leaking corrosive fluids onto the motherboard and causing damage with age. Modularity was another unique aspect to the machine, with the CPU, audio, video, and input-output ports all on separate daughterboards. This made the machine near-modular.

The machine was targeted as a high-end video workstation with expandability in mind and an eye towards NewTek's Video Toaster. Its motherboard contains two Amiga Video Slots, five 100-pin Zorro III slots, and 4 ISA slots, and its case can accommodate up to six drives. Up to 16 MB of RAM can be installed on the motherboard, while additional RAM can be installed on some CPU boards (up to 128 MB), and yet more can be added on Zorro cards.

This was the last computer to be released by Commodore International. It is estimated that only 200 Commodore-branded A4000Ts were produced before the company folded. Production of the A4000T was restarted after Escom bought the Amiga assets. Apart from the new option of a 68060 CPU, the Escom-manufactured 4000Ts had minor differences from the old one including the substitution of the high density floppy drive with a double density one, and a different front bezel on the case.

Specifications 
 CPU:
 68040 at 25 MHz (1994)
 68060 at 50 MHz (1996)
 Memory:
 512 kB Kickstart ROM
 2 MB Amiga Chip RAM
 Up to a further 16 MB RAM on board
 Up to an additional 128 MB RAM via the CPU slot on the CPU's local bus
 Up to an additional 512 MB per Zorro III slot
 Chipset: AGA (Advanced Graphics Architecture)
 Video:
 24-bit color palette (16.8 Million colors)
 Up to 256 on-screen colors in indexed mode
 262,144 on-screen colors in HAM-8 mode
 Resolutions of up to 1280×512i (more with overscan)
 HSync rates of 15.60-31.44 kHz
 Audio (Paula):
 4 hardware channels (Stereo)
 8-bit resolution / 6-bit volume
 Maximum DMA sampling rate of 28-56 kHz (depending on video mode in use)
 Removable Storage:
 3.5" HD floppy disk drive, capacity 1.76 MB
 Internal Storage:
 34-pin floppy connector
 40-pin buffered ATA-Controller
 50-pin fast SCSI-2
 Input/Output connections:
 Analogue RGB video out (DB-23M)
 Audio out (2 × RCA)
 Audio out (1 × 3.5mm headphone jack)
 Keyboard (5 pin DIN)
 2 × Mouse/Gamepad ports (DE9)
 RS-232 serial port (DB-25M)
 Centronics style parallel port (DB-25F)
 Fast SCSI-2 (D-High density DB-50F)
 Expansion Slots:
 5 × 100pin 32-bit Zorro III slots
 2 × AGA video slots (inline with Zorro slot)
 4 × 16-bit ISA slots (require bridgeboard to activate)
 1 × 200-pin CPU expansion slot
 4 × 72-pin SIMMs slots
 Operating System:
 AmigaOS 3.1 (Kickstart 3.1/Workbench 3.1)
 Other Characteristics:
 0 × front accessible 3.5" drive bays
 5 × front accessible 5.25" drive bay
 1 × internal 5.25" drive mountings
 Key lock (disables mouse and keyboard)

See also 

 Amiga models and variants

References

External links 

 Ryan E. A. Czerwinski's Commodore Amiga 4000T page
 Commodore A4000T (Amiga History Guide)
 Amiga Technologies A4000T (Amiga History Guide)
 Famous Amiga Uses

Amiga computers
Computer-related introductions in 1994